Larry Paul Mitchell (born October 16, 1971 in Flint, Michigan) is a former pitcher in Major League Baseball. He played for the Philadelphia Phillies in 1996.

Mitchell founded a small start-up in August 2012 called "Freeagent Pros", which provides lesson referrals for all kinds of sports.

References

External links

1971 births
Living people
Baseball players from Flint, Michigan
Batavia Clippers players
Birmingham Barons players
Bowie Baysox players
James Madison Dukes baseball players
Major League Baseball pitchers
Martinsville Phillies players
Norwich Navigators players
Philadelphia Phillies players
Reading Phillies players
Scranton/Wilkes-Barre Red Barons players
Spartanburg Phillies players